Christine Lynn Firkins (born July 6, 1983) is a Canadian teacher and former actress who starred in the 1997 film Speed 2: Cruise Control as Drew.  She also made a guest appearance in The X-Files series as Thea Sprecher in the 8th season two-part premiere, "Within" and "Without". She is deaf and attended California State University, Northridge. She currently teaches American Sign Language.

Filmography

References

External links

1983 births
Living people
Canadian film actresses
Canadian television actresses
Deaf actresses
California State University, Northridge alumni
Canadian deaf people